is a Japanese football player. He plays for Kataller Toyama.

Playing career
Junya Imase joined to J2 League club Mito HollyHock in 2015.

Club statistics
Updated to 23 February 2018.

References

External links
Profile at Mito HollyHock
Profile at J. League Official Site

1993 births
Living people
Kokushikan University alumni
People from Ichihara, Chiba
Association football people from Chiba Prefecture
Japanese footballers
J2 League players
J3 League players
Mito HollyHock players
Kataller Toyama players
Association football defenders